Koungheul is a commune in central Senegal in the department of the same name. It lies in the region of Kaffrine and is situated between the towns of Kaolack and Tambacounda. There are about 15,000 inhabitants, most of whom are Wolof people.

Transport 
It is served by a railway station on the Dakar-Niger Railway.

Climate
Koungheul has a hot semi-arid climate (Köppen BSh) with no rainfall from November to May and moderate to heavy rainfall from June to October.

See also 
 Railway stations in Senegal

References 

Populated places in Kaffrine Region
Communes of Senegal
French West Africa